Réka Pupp (born 4 July 1996) is a Hungarian judoka. She is a bronze medalist at the European Judo Championships and she competed at multiple editions of the World Judo Championships. She also represented Hungary at the 2020 Summer Olympics in Tokyo, Japan and the European Games in 2015 and 2019.

Career
She competed in the women's 52 kg event at the 2017 European Judo Championships held in Warsaw, Poland. She also competed in the women's 52 kg event at the 2017 World Judo Championships held in Budapest, Hungary where she was eliminated in her second match by Charline Van Snick of Belgium.

At the 2018 Judo Grand Prix Antalya held in Antalya, Turkey, she won one of the bronze medals in the women's 52 kg event. In that same year, she won the silver medal in the women's 52 kg event at the 2018 European U23 Judo Championships held in Győr, Hungary.

In 2019, she competed in the women's 52 kg event at the World Judo Championships held in Tokyo, Japan. She also competed in the women's 52 kg event at the 2020 European Judo Championships held in Prague, Czech Republic.

In January 2021, she competed in the women's 52 kg event at the Judo World Masters held in Doha, Qatar. A month later, she won one of the bronze medals in her event at the Judo Grand Slam Tel Aviv held in Tel Aviv, Israel. She repeated this at the 2021 Judo Grand Slam Tbilisi held in Tbilisi, Georgia. Her bronze medal streak continued a few weeks later in the women's 52 kg event at the 2021 European Judo Championships held in Lisbon, Portugal. In June 2021, she competed in the women's 52 kg event at the World Judo Championships held in Budapest, Hungary.

In 2021, she lost her bronze medal match in the women's 52 kg event at the 2020 Summer Olympics in Tokyo, Japan. A few months later, she won the gold medal in her event at the 2021 Judo Grand Slam Baku held in Baku, Azerbaijan.

She won one of the bronze medals in her event at the 2022 Judo Grand Slam Tel Aviv held in Tel Aviv, Israel. She won the gold medal in her event at the 2022 Judo Grand Slam Antalya held in Antalya, Turkey. She also won the gold medal in her event at the 2022 Judo Grand Slam Budapest held in Budapest, Hungary.

Achievements

References

External links
 
 
 

Living people
1996 births
Place of birth missing (living people)
Hungarian female judoka
Judoka at the 2015 European Games
Judoka at the 2019 European Games
European Games competitors for Hungary
Judoka at the 2020 Summer Olympics
Olympic judoka of Hungary
21st-century Hungarian women